Frank Carter & the Rattlesnakes are an English punk rock band formed in 2015 by frontman Frank Carter with guitarist Dean Richardson. Famed for their raucous live shows, the band released their debut album Blossom in 2015, and the follow-ups Modern Ruin in 2017 and End of Suffering in 2019. Their fourth album, Sticky, was released in October 2021.

History

Formation, Rotten EP, and Blossom (2015)

After leaving the band Gallows in 2011 due to artistic differences, Carter started Pure Love, a project with guitarist Jim Carroll, ending that band in 2015 to form Frank Carter & the Rattlesnakes with guitarist Dean Richardson, formerly of Heights. Carter and Richardson had met a few years earlier, when Carter asked Richardson, who was also a designer and coder, to make him a website. With The Rattlesnakes, Carter returned to his hardcore roots, while retaining some of the power-pop sensibilities of Pure Love.

On 4 May 2015, Frank Carter & The Rattlesnakes released the three-track EP Rotten. The three songs would also appear on the band's debut full-length album, Blossom, released on International Death Cult on 14 August 2015. It peaked at #18 on the UK Albums Chart. Carter has described Blossom as being "about sadness and not knowing what to do with it."

Modern Ruin and live album (2016–2018)

The band finished recording Modern Ruin in January 2016, just a few months after the launch their first album. Modern Ruin was released on International Death Cult on 20 January 2017. It peaked at number 7 on the UK Albums Chart, and number 23 on the Billboard Heatseekers Albums chart. The album has a moodier feel than Blossom. It was recorded by Thomas Mitchener, formerly the band's touring bassist, in his Broadfields studio in Watford, England, which is also where Blossom was recorded.    

In November 2017 the band announced a live album. 23 Live At Brixton Academy was released on 9 March 2018, having been recorded at their 8 December 2017 headline show at the O2 Academy Brixton in London, where they played every song from their first two albums plus their new single "Spray Paint Love".

End of Suffering and Blossom reissue (2019–2020)

The band released their third album, End of Suffering, on International Death Cult on 3 May 2019. The album peaked at #4 on the UK Albums Chart. NME wrote that the album "resembles a firework display on this dazzling record" where Carter "continues to mine increasingly sensitive territory, with impressive results." Some of the tracks address Carter's mental-health battle. Three singles were released off the album: "Crowbar", "Anxiety", and "Kitty Sucker". Rage Against the Machine and Audioslave guitarist Tom Morello guests on the song "Tyrant Lizard King". The collaboration came about after Carter ran into Morello in Spain at the festival Resurrection, and performed "Killing in the Name" with Morello's band Prophets of Rage. Following the album's release, the band toured in support of it, culminating in a sold-out show to 10,000 fans at London's Alexandra Palace in February 2020. However, any further tour plans throughout 2020 were cancelled due to the COVID-19 pandemic, forcing a premature end to the End of Suffering album cycle. 

In light of this period of unanticipated inactivity, the band unearthed archive recordings from their debut album Blossom and announced a reissue to celebrate the fifth anniversary of its release in June 2020. The reissue features live versions of the record's original ten tracks, in addition  to three previously unreleased studio tracks. One of the unreleased tracks, "Fire", was released ahead of the reissue as the lead single, with the rest of the album following in October 2020.

Sticky (2021–present)

Following the cancellation of any further tour plans in support of End of Suffering due to the COVID-19 pandemic, the band began working on new music. This culminated in the release of the single "My Town", featuring Idles frontman Joe Talbot in April 2021. The band then announced their fourth album, Sticky, alongside its eponymous single in July 2021. The record, released on 15 October 2021, was produced by guitarist and primary band member Dean Richardson and features further guest appearances from Lynks, Cassyette and Bobby Gillespie.

Musical style
The band's musical style has been associated with rock, punk rock and hardcore genres. According to Carter they "perfectly fill the gap between indie, punk and rock and roll." Carter has described the band's songwriting style as a mixture of all the musical genres the band likes, "pouring it together in a melting pot that is real and new." He told the BBC in 2017, "Punk to me is not a sound, it's not a fashion, it's not a lifestyle. It's a mindset. You either have it or you don't."

Performances
Carter is known as a dynamic live performer, delivering high-energy sets. The band has also aimed to foster a safe, respectful, and inclusive environment at their live performances. They encourage equality and empowerment with their fans, with Carter calling for only female and non-binary fans to crowdsurf in a safe environment during certain songs. In 2019 Carter was quoted as saying, "Rock gigs have been dominated by men for years - all bands need to work to empower women."

The Rattlesnakes' first tour was the Rotten UK Tour from May to June 2015. In March 2016 they toured the UK and Ireland. They performed on the Kerrang! Tour 2016 in support of Sum 41. In February 2017, they supported Biffy Clyro on tour. In October 2017, the band cancelled their North American tour, following the cancellation of four weeks of touring in Europe, so that Carter could focus on his mental health and wellbeing. The band had to pull out of some shows in the summer of 2018, including the INmusic Festival in Croatia, after they were involved in a bus crash.

After playing a secret set at Reading Festival in 2018, the band played the festival's main stage in 2019. In the spring and summer of 2019, they toured the UK and Europe, and performed at the Hellendoorn Dauwpop Festival, Primavera Sound, Deichbrand, and Sziget Festival. They supported Foo Fighters on their 2019 European Tour, and supported Bring Me the Horizon on their 2019 Australia Tour. The band headlined the 2019 Monster Energy Outbreak Tour. Their 2019 North American tour was set to begin on 23 September 2019 in New York City, with The Beaches as the opening band on most dates, but the tour was cancelled due to Carter being in a car crash several days before the first show. The Rattlesnakes will headline a tour of Australia in 2020 and played three UK sold-out shows in February, at the Alexandra Palace, Glasgow's Barrowlands and the Manchester Academy.

Members
Current members
Frank Carter – lead vocals (2015–present)
Dean Richardson – guitars (2015–present)
Tom "Tank" Barclay – bass, keyboards, synthesizer, backing vocals  (2016–present)
Gareth Grover – drums (2016–present)

Current touring musicians
Elliot Russell – guitars, keyboards, synthesizer (2019–present)

Former members
Memby Jago – drums (2015–2016)
Thomas Mitchener – guitars, synthesizer, keyboards (2017–2018), bass (2015–2016)

Discography

Studio albums

Live albums

Extended plays

Singles
"Juggernaut" (2015)
"I Hate You" (2015)
"Devil Inside Me" (2016)
"Snake Eyes" (2016)
"Lullaby" (2016)
"Wild Flowers" (2016)
"Modern Ruin" (2017)
"Vampires" (2017)
"Spray Paint Love" (2017)
"Crowbar" (2019)
"Anxiety" (2019)
"Kitty Sucker" (2019)
"Fire" (2020)
"My Town" (featuring Joe Talbot) (2021)
”The Drugs” (2022)
”Parasite” (2022)

Music videos 

 "Juggernaut" (2015)
 "Trouble" (2015)
 "Devil Inside Me" (2016)
 "Snake Eyes" (2016)
 "Lullaby" (2016)
 "Wild Flowers" (2017)
 "Vampires" (2017)
 "Spray Paint Love" (2017)
 "Crowbar" (2019)
 "Anxiety" (2019)
 "Kitty Sucker" (2019)
 "Fire" (2020)
 "My Town" (2021)
”The Drugs” (2022)
”Parasite” (2022)

Awards and nominations

Notes

References

External links

 Official website

Hemel Hempstead
2015 establishments in England
Musical groups established in 2015
Musical quartets
British hardcore punk groups
English punk rock groups